Isastrea is an extinct genus of corals that lived during the Jurassic and Cretaceous periods. Its fossils have been found in Europe, Africa, North America, Asia and South America.

Description 
Isastrea belonged to a group known as the hexacorals, so named for the shape of each individual polyp skeleton (corallite). In addition, 30–80 septa (walls dividing body cavities) were present in each animal. Its walls were "weak, discontinuous or absent". In some species, adjacent septa would fuse. Dissepiments ("small blistery plates" serving the purpose of internal support) were plentiful in the animal. Columella (central "rod- or plate-like" structures) were present as well, but were not very strong. The colonies were "massive", "encrusting, platey, dome-shaped or sometimes ramose". It was a hermatypic coral, which require "warm, clear, shallow water" and live in symbiotic relationships with algae. It is also likely that zooxanthellae (a kind of protozoa) lived on the coral. It has been theorized that Isastrea could endure lower temperatures than most other hermatypic corals because it occurs farther north than them.

Species and fossil sites 
At least 49 species of Isastrea have been described. Milne-Edwards and Haime originally described the following species of Isastrea:

References

Notes

Inline citations

General references 

 

Scleractinia genera
Prehistoric Hexacorallia genera
Mesozoic invertebrates
Jurassic animals of Europe
Cretaceous animals of Africa
Mesozoic animals of Asia
Mesozoic animals of North America
Mesozoic animals of South America
Jurassic Argentina
Jurassic Colombia
Jurassic Peru
Cretaceous Venezuela
Fossil taxa described in 1851
Taxa named by Henri Milne-Edwards
Taxa named by Jules Haime